Far North District Council is the territorial authority for the Far North District of New Zealand.

The council is led by the mayor of Far North, who is currently Moko Tepania. There are also nine ward councillors.

Councillors

 Mayor Moko Tepania
 Ngā Tai o Tokerau Ward: Hilda Halkyard-Harawira, Tāmati Rakena, Babe Kapa & Penetaui Kleskovic 
 Bay of Islands Whangaroa ward: Deputy Mayor Kelly Stratford, Steve McNally & Ann Court
 Kaikohe-Hokianga ward: John Vujcich
 Te Hiku ward: Felicity Foy, Mate Radich

History

The council was formed in 1989, replacing the Bay of Islands County Council, Kaikohe Borough Council (1947–1989), Kaitaia Borough Council (1922–1989), Hokianga County Council, Mangonui County Council and Whangaroa County Council (1876–1989).

In 2020, the council had 384 staff, including 55 earning more than $100,000. According to the right-wing Taxpayers' Union think tank, residential rates averaged $2,428.

References

External links
 Far North District Council

Far North District
Politics of the Northland Region
Territorial authorities of New Zealand